Tomashevich or Tomashevych may refer to:

 Tomashevich Pegas
 Dmitri Lyudvigovich Tomashevich
 Dmitri Tomashevich
 George Vid Tomashevich
 Kirill Tomashevich
 Mikalai Dvornikau (Stanislav Tomashevich)

See also 

 Tomašević

Russian-language surnames